Turan is a town and the administrative center of Piy-Khemsky District in the Tuva Republic, Russia, located  northwest of Kyzyl, the capital of the republic. As of the 2010 Census, its population was 4,981.

Etymology
The name of the town comes from the Turkic word for "saline land."

History
It was founded in 1885 by Russian settlers from Siberia; town status was granted to it in 1945.

Administrative and municipal status

Within the framework of administrative divisions, Turan serves as the administrative center of Piy-Khemsky District. As an administrative division, it is, together with three rural localities, incorporated within Piy-Khemsky District as Turan Town Under District Jurisdiction. As a municipal division, Turan Town Under District Jurisdiction is incorporated within Piy-Khemsky Municipal District as Turan Urban Settlement.

Transportation
There is an airport in the town.

References

Notes

Sources

Cities and towns in Tuva
1885 establishments in China